Mojtaba Karamian (born 13 March 1989) is an Iranian handball player for Sskc Club and the Iranian national team.

References

1989 births
Living people
Iranian male handball players
Handball players at the 2014 Asian Games